The 2019 FIBA U20 Women's European Championship was the 15th edition of the Women's European basketball championship Division B for national under-20 teams. Held from 3 to 11 August in Pristina, Kosovo, 12 teams participated in the tournament.

Venues

Participating teams

  (16th place, 2018 FIBA U20 Women's European Championship)
 

 
 (host)

First round
The draw took place on 13 December 2018 in Belgrade, Serbia.

Group A

Group B

Group C

Group D

Second round

Group E

Group F

9th–12th place classification

Group G

Knockout stage

5th–8th place playoffs

5th–8th place semifinals

7th place game

5th place game

Championship playoffs

Semifinals

3rd place game

Final

Final standings

Awards

All-Tournament Team
  Karina Konstantinova
  Awak Kuier 
  Lotta Vehka-aho (MVP)
  Holly Winterburn 
  Claire Melia

References

External links
FIBA official website

2019
2019–20 in European women's basketball
2019 in youth sport
August 2019 sports events in Europe
International youth basketball competitions hosted by Kosovo
Sports competitions in Pristina
21st century in Pristina